The Lublin Voivodeship, also known as the Lublin Province (Polish: województwo lubelskie ), is a voivodeship (province) of Poland, located in southeastern part of the country. It was created on January 1, 1999, out of the former Lublin, Chełm, Zamość, Biała Podlaska and (partially) Tarnobrzeg and Siedlce Voivodeships, pursuant to Polish local government reforms adopted in 1998. The region is named after its largest city and regional capital, Lublin, and its territory is made of four historical lands: the western part of the voivodeship, with Lublin itself, belongs to Lesser Poland, the eastern part of Lublin Area belongs to Red Ruthenia, and the northeast belongs to Polesie and Podlasie.
Lublin Voivodeship borders Subcarpathian Voivodeship to the south, Świętokrzyskie Voivodeship to the south-west, Masovian Voivodeship to the west and north, Podlaskie Voivodeship along a short boundary to the north, Belarus (Brest Region) and Ukraine (Lviv Oblast and Volyn Oblasts) to the east. The region's population as of 2019 was 2,112,216.

History 
The Polish historical region that encompasses Lublin, and approximates Lublin Voivodeship as it was before the Partitions of Poland, is known as Lubelszczyzna. Provinces centred on Lublin have existed throughout much of Poland's history; for details see the section below on Previous Lublin Voivodeships.

The region was, before World War II, one of the world's leading centres of Judaism. Before the middle of the 16th century, there were few Jews in the area, concentrated in Lublin, Kazimierz Dolny, and perhaps Chełm; but the founding of new private towns led to a large movement of Jews into the region to develop trade and services. Since these new towns competed with the existing towns for business, there followed a low-intensity, long-lasting feeling of resentment, with failed attempts to limit the Jewish immigration. The Jews tended to settle mostly in the cities and towns, with only individual families setting up businesses in the rural regions; this urban/rural division became another factor feeding resentment of the newly arrived economic competitors. By the middle of the 18th century, Jews were a significant part of the population in Kraśnik, Lubartów and Łęczna.

By the 20th century, Jews represented greater than 70% of the population in eleven towns and close to 100% of the population of Laszczów and Izbica. From this region came both religious figures such as Mordechai Josef Leiner of Izbica, Chaim Israel Morgenstern of Puławy, and Motele Rokeach of Biłgoraj, as well as famous secular authors Israel Joshua Singer. Israel's brother, the Nobel prize winner Isaac Bashevis Singer, was not born in Biłgoraj but lived part of his life in the city. The "Old Town" of the city of Lublin contained a famous yeshiva, Jewish hospital, synagogue, cemetery, and kahal, as well as the Grodzka Gate (known as the Jewish Gate).

Before the war, there were 300,000 Jews living in the region, which became the site of the Majdanek concentration camp and Bełżec extermination camp  as well as several labour camps (Trawniki, Poniatowa, Budzyn, Puławy, Zamość, Biała Podlaska, and the Lublin work camps Lipowa 7 camp , Flugplatz, and Sportplatz) which produced military supplies for the Wehrmacht and Luftwaffe). This was once one of the biggest forced labour centres in occupied Europe, with approximately 45,000 Jewish prisoners. As well, the Sobibór extermination camp was located in the Lublin Voivodeship. After the war, the few surviving Jews largely left the area; today there is some restoration of areas of Jewish historical interest, and a surge of tourism by Jews seeking to view their families' historical roots.

Cities and towns 

The voivodeship contains 5 cities and 43 towns. These are listed below in descending order of population (according to official figures for 2019:

Administrative division 
Lublin Voivodeship is divided into 24 counties (powiats): 4 city counties and 20 land counties. These are further divided into 213 gminas.

The counties are listed in the following table (ordering within categories is by decreasing population).

Protected areas

Protected areas in Lublin Voivodeship include two National Parks and 17 Landscape Parks. These are listed below.
Polesie National Park (this and surrounding areas form the West Polesie biosphere reserve designated by UNESCO in 2002)
Roztocze National Park
Chełm Landscape Park
Janów Forests Landscape Park (partly in Subcarpathian Voivodeship)
Kazimierz Landscape Park
Kozłówka Landscape Park
Krasnobród Landscape Park
Krzczonów Landscape Park
Łęczna Lake District Landscape Park
Podlaskie Bug Gorge Landscape Park (partly in Masovian Voivodeship)
Polesie Landscape Park
Puszcza Solska Landscape Park (partly in Subcarpathian Voivodeship)
Skierbieszów Landscape Park
Sobibór Landscape Park
South Roztocze Landscape Park (partly in Subcarpathian Voivodeship)
Strzelce Landscape Park
Szczebrzeszyn Landscape Park
Wieprz Landscape Park
Wrzelowiec Landscape Park

Economy 
The Gross domestic product (GDP) of the province was 18.5 billion euros in 2018, accounting for 3.7% of Polish economic output. GDP per capita adjusted for purchasing power was 14,400 euros or 48% of the EU27 average in the same year. The GDP per employee was 54% of the EU average. Lublin Voivodship is the province with the lowest GDP per capita in Poland.

Demographics 
Population according to 2002 census:
 Poles - 2 171 415
 Ukrainians - 694

Most common surnames in the region 
Wójcik: 12,937
Mazurek: 9,644
Mazur: 8,019

Previous Lublin Voivodeships

Lublin Voivodeship 1474–1795

Lublin Voivodeship was an administrative region of the Kingdom of Poland created in 1474 out of parts of Sandomierz Voivodeship and lasting until the Partitions of Poland in 1795. It was part of the prowincja of Lesser Poland.

Lublin Voivodeship 1816–1837
Lublin Voivodeship was one of the voivodeships of Congress Poland. It was formed in 1816 from Lublin Department, and in 1837 was transformed into Lublin Governorate.

Lublin Voivodeship 1919–1939

Lublin Voivodeship (Województwo Lubelskie) was one of the administrative regions of the interwar Second Polish Republic. According to the 1931 census, 85.1% of its population was Polish, 10.5% Jewish, and 3% Ukrainian.

Lublin Voivodeship 1945–1975
Lublin Voivodeship (województwo lubelskie) was an administrative region of Poland between 1945 and 1975. In 1975 it was transformed into Chełm, Zamość, Biała Podlaska, Tarnobrzeg and Siedlce Voivodeships and a smaller Lublin Voivodeship.

Lublin Voivodeship 1975–1998

Lublin Voivodeship (województwo lubelskie) existed as one of Poland's 49 voivodeships from 1975 until 1998, when it was incorporated into the current (larger) Lublin Voivodeship.

References

External links

Lublin Voivodeship official website
Adam Mickiewicz Institute page on Jewish history in the Lublin Region

 
States and territories established in 1999